Kermit Swiler Champa (August 20, 1939 – July 22, 2004) was an American art historian and educator. A scholar of Impressionism, Champa was the Andrea V. Rosenthal Professor of the History of Art and Architecture at Brown University from 1970 to 2004.

Career
Born in Lancaster to Valentino Anthony and Gladys Swiler, Champa earned a Bachelor of Arts in Art History from Yale University in 1960, where he played trombone. He went on to receive a Doctor of Philosophy in Art History from Harvard University in 1965, where he studied under Frederick B. Deknatel and Clement Greenberg. Champa wrote a doctoral dissertation about the Impressionist period, under Deknatel.

A specialist on Impressionist paintings, Champa first taught at Yale as an Assistant Professor of Art History. He then moved to Brown University in 1970. A year later, he was honored by the Government of Germany with the Order of Merit of the Federal Republic of Germany. In 1974, Champa became a full Professor and was named the Andrea V. Rosenthal Professor of the History of Art and Architecture in 1995. He taught there until death in 2004 from lung cancer.

Selected works
German Painting of the 19th Century, 1970
Studies in Early Impressionism, 1973
Mondrian Studies, 1985
The Rise of Landscape Painting in France: Corot to Monet, 1991
Masterpiece Studies: Manet, Zola, Van Gogh, and Monet, 1994

See also
List of Brown University faculty
List of Harvard University people
List of Yale University people

References

External links
New York Times obituary

1939 births
2004 deaths
Historians from Pennsylvania
People from Lancaster, Pennsylvania
Yale College alumni
Harvard Graduate School of Arts and Sciences alumni
American art historians
Brown University faculty
Officers Crosses of the Order of Merit of the Federal Republic of Germany
Deaths from lung cancer in the United States